Manhattan Theatre Club (MTC) is a theatre company located in New York City, affiliated with the League of Resident Theatres. Under the leadership of Artistic Director Lynne Meadow and Executive Producer Barry Grove, Manhattan Theatre Club has grown since its founding in 1970 from an Off-Off Broadway showcase into one of the country's most acclaimed theatre organizations.

MTC's many awards include 19 Tony Awards, six Pulitzer Prizes, 48 Obie Awards and 32 Drama Desk Awards, as well as numerous Drama Critics Circle, Outer Critics Circle and Theatre World Awards. MTC has won the Lucille Lortel Award for Outstanding Achievement, a Drama Desk for Outstanding Excellence, and a Theatre World for Outstanding Achievement.

MTC produces plays and musicals on and off-Broadway.

During the Fall of 2020, the MTC announced its plans for its 2021-22 season, featuring two Broadway and two off-Broadway productions as the company continues to track and adjust according to the COVID-19 health and safety guidelines.

Notable productions
 Eastern Standard by Richard Greenberg
 Ruined by Lynn Nottage
 Mauritius by Theresa Rebeck
 LoveMusik, book by Alfred Uhry and songs by Kurt Weill
 Blackbird by David Harrower
 Translations by Brian Friel
 Rabbit Hole by David Lindsay-Abaire
 Doubt by John Patrick Shanley
 Proof by David Auburn
 The Tale of the Allergist's Wife by Charles Busch
 Crimes of the Heart by Beth Henley
 Sight Unseen by Donald Margulies
 Love! Valour! Compassion! by Terrence McNally
 Ain't Misbehavin', the Fats Waller musical
 King Hedley II by August Wilson
 Nocturama by Annie Baker (reading)

Facilities
The Samuel J. Friedman Theatre

The Manhattan Theatre Club purchased the Biltmore Theatre in 2001 as a Broadway home for its productions. After renovations, it re-opened in October 2003. With 650 seats the Friedman has about two-thirds of the capacity of the old Biltmore Theatre, although it now boasts modern conveniences such as elevators and meeting rooms. The theatre was renamed the "Samuel J. Friedman Theatre" on September 4, 2008 in honor of Broadway publicist Samuel Friedman.

New York City Center, Stage I & Stage II

In 1984, the Manhattan Theatre Club moved to New York City Center's lower level. The Manhattan Theatre Club performance space comprises a 299-seat theatre with fixed seating (Stage I) and a 150-seat studio theatre with variable seating configurations (Stage II).

References

External links
 
 
 
 Manhattan Theatre Club records 1964–2004 (bulk 1970–1994), held by the Billy Rose Theatre Division, New York Public Library for the Performing Arts

Theatre companies in New York City
1970 establishments in New York City
Arts organizations established in 1970
Broadway theatre
Off-Broadway